The Slavyanoserbsk uezd was one of the subdivisions of the Yekaterinoslav Governorate of the Russian Empire. It was situated in the eastern part of the governorate. Its administrative centre was Slovianoserbsk until 1882 and Luhansk after that.

Demographics
At the time of the Russian Empire Census of 1897, Slavyanoserbsky Uyezd had a population of 174,753. Of these, 50.5% spoke Ukrainian, 45.4% Russian, 1.5% Yiddish, 0.9% Belarusian, 0.5% German, 0.5% Moldovan or Romanian, 0.3% Polish, 0.1% Romani, 0.1% Tatar, 0.1% Armenian and 0.1% French as their native language.

References

 
Uyezds of Yekaterinoslav Governorate
Yekaterinoslav Governorate